Sky (stylized as sky) is Yui Horie's third solo album. A limited edition version of this album was released with an alternate album cover and included a photo book. This album also has the opening and ending themes from her radio show "Tenshi no Tamago".

Track listing
"お気に入りの自転車"    (o-Ki ni iri no jitensha, My favourite bicycle)
"Romantic flight"
"Eyes memorize"
"見つめられたら" ~ when I fall in love with you    (Mitsumeraretara, When being gazed upon)
"Rain"
"It's my style"
"タイムカプセル"    (Taimu kapuseru, Time capsule)
"ひまわりと飛行機雲"    (Himawari to hikōkigumo, Sunflowers and a vapor trail)
"Angel 恋をした"    (Angel koi o shita, Angel, I fell in love)
"All my love" - album mix
"Tomorrow"
"I just wanna be with you"
"In the sky"

Yui Horie albums
2003 albums